Lac-Metei is an unorganized territory in the Abitibi-Témiscamingue region of Quebec, Canada. It is one of five unorganized territories in the La Vallée-de-l'Or Regional County Municipality.

It retained only a small wedge-shaped piece of land that was renamed to Lac-Metei.

Demographics
Population:
 Population in 2011: 0
 Population in 2006: 0
 Population in 2001: 0
 Population in 1996: 0

References

Unorganized territories in Abitibi-Témiscamingue